Cyril Errol Melchiades Charles (born 10 December 1941) is a Saint Lucian politician, who has served as the acting governor-general of Saint Lucia since 11 November 2021, following the resignation of Sir Neville Cenac.

Early life and education

Charles was born on 10 December 1941 in Castries, Saint Lucia.

He attended St. Aloysius R.C. Boys' School, Castries, and later studied at St. Mary's College, Saint Lucia. At Wolsey Hall, England, Charles completed his correspondence in English, Mathematics, History, Political Science (including the Constitution of the United Kingdom). He completed a course in income tax law and a three month training course in examination of accounts in Trinidad and Tobago.

Career

1962–1992

From 1962 to 1992, Charles worked in the following departments of the Government of Saint Lucia:

Temporary Clerk in the Treasury Department of the Accountant General Chambers.
Junior Clerk, Income Tax Inspector, and later Senior Income Tax Inspector in the Inland Revenue Department.
Senior Licensing Officer in the Ministry of Communications Works, Transport and Public Utilities.

1993–2021

From 1993 to 2007, Charles worked as a Human Resources Manager and a Legislative Officer in J.Q. Charles Limited.

In 2007, he became self employed and worked as a Tax Management Consultant till 2021.

Acting Governor-General

Elizabeth II, Queen of Saint Lucia, appointed Charles as the acting governor-general of Saint Lucia following the resignation of Sir Neville Cenac. Charles was sworn in at Government House, Saint Lucia on 11 November 2021.

Personal life

Charles is a Roman Catholic and speaks English and French Creole.

He is married to Anysia Samuel.

References 

Governors-General of Saint Lucia
1941 births
Living people